Lenešice is a municipality and village in Louny District in the Ústí nad Labem Region of the Czech Republic. It has about 1,400 inhabitants.

Notable people
Jaroslava Sedláčková (born 1946), gymnast, Olympic medalist

References

Villages in Louny District